Apostle Dr. Michael Kwabena Ntumy is a Ghanaian Pentecostal televangelist, an Apostle and the fourth Chairman of The Church of Pentecost (COP) from 1998 to 2008.

Early life and ministry 
Michael Ntumy was a teacher in Yendi in the 1980s before, becoming a Deacon and Elder, before marrying Martha at 24. He began full-time ministry at 26 with the Church of Pentecost. He was called to the office of an Apostle at 33 and six years after, was elected the fourth Chairman of The Church of Pentecost. After serving for 2 terms (10 years), he handed over to Apostle Professor Opoku Onyinah.

He is known to have survived many challenges which include being held hostage in rebel territory (Liberian Civil War-1990's), attacks on his life ranging from physical assaults to poisoning and paralysis leading to his confinement to a  wheelchair. He served the church in Liberia and Ivory Coast.

Positions held and awards 

 Director of Literary Works, The Church of Pentecost
 Chairman (International President) of The Church of Pentecost (1998-2008)
 President, Ghana Pentecostal and Charismatic Council (1998-2008)
 Vice-president/President, Bible Society of Ghana (2000-2008)
 Chancellor, Pentecost University College (2003-2008)
 Member, Ghana AIDS Commission (2003-2008)
 National Award Laureate, Order of the Volta, Companion (Civil Division) (2006)
 Minister of The Church of Pentecost since 1984
 Missionary of The Church of Pentecost to Liberia, Ivory Coast, France/Switzerland (1988-1998)

See also 

 The Church of Pentecost
 Pentecost University College
 Ghana Peace Council

References

External links 

 Church's Website

Living people
Ghanaian theologians
Ghanaian Pentecostals
Ghanaian religious leaders
People from Ashanti Region
1958 births